The de Bernardi M.d.B. 02 Aeroscooter is a two-seat light sport aircraft designed by Mario De Bernardi as a follow-on to the single-seat Partenavia P.53 Aeroscooter.

Development
having developed the all-metal single-seat Partenavia Aeroscooter earlier, Mario de Bernardi sought to improve the design as the two-seat M.d.B. 02 Aeroscooter was developed as a  aircraft to be built by CAP in Bergamo, Italy.

Design
The Aeroscooter is a low-wing, two-seat monoplane. The partial welded steel tube fuselage uses aluminum skins. The wing uses a wood spar. The tricycle landing gear uses trailing link suspension. The single-piece plexiglas canopy slides forward to open. All fuel is housed in the  header tank and  main tank behind the passenger's seat.

Operational history
The prototype was built by De Bernardi with the assistance of two mechanics. In April 1959, De Bernardi died of a heart attack after flying a demonstration of the prototype at Rome Urbe Airport.

An example is on display at Museo Aeronautico Caproni di Taledo, Milano.

Variants
The daughter of De Bernardi is offering plans for a modernized version of the Aeroscooter using a Rotax 912UL engine to be flown under Italian microlight category.

Specifications (M.d.B. 02 Aeroscooter)

See also

References

1950s Italian civil utility aircraft
Low-wing aircraft
Aircraft first flown in 1957
Single-engined tractor aircraft